Hope Channel International, Inc. is a Christian lifestyle television network and is a subsidiary company of the General Conference of Seventh-day Adventists. The network operates globally, with 67 Hope Channels worldwide, each providing programs contextualized to the language and culture of their audience. Focusing on balanced, Christian living, Hope Channel programs cover topics such as mind, body, spirit, family, and community. Hope Channel is available on DirecTV channel 368 in the United States, cable, satellite, multiple channels are available via Roku, Apple TV, Amazon Fire TV, Android TV and Chromecast devices, Hope Channel app available at App Store for Apple users and at Google Play for Android users, via FaithStream and online at www.HopeTV.org.

Hope Channel Global Networks 

Hope Channel is broadcast throughout the world:

Satellite Channels
Hope Channel 
Hope Channel International 
Hope Channel Deaf 
Hope Channel Inter-America 
Esperanza TV Interamérica 
Espérance TV Interamérique 
Hope Channel Australia 
Hope Channel India 
Esperanza TV 
Hope Channel China 
Nuevo Tiempo 
Novo Tempo 
SperanțaTV 
Hope Channel American Samoa 
Hope Channel Europe 
Hope TV Fiji Islands
Hope TV Deutsch 
Hope Channel France 
Hope Channel Indonesia 
Hope Channel Italy
Hope Channel Japan
Hope Channel Philippines 
Hope Channel UK
Hope Channel Polska 
Hope Channel Korea 
Hope Channel-Ghana
Hope Channel Middle East and North Africa:
Hope Channel Arabic (Al-Waad TV)
Hope Channel Turkish (Kanal Umut)
Hope Channel Persian (Omid TV)
Hope Channel Bulgaria
Hope Channel Canada
Hope Channel Denmark
Hope Channel Malawi
Hope Channel New Zealand
Hope Channel Norway
Hope Channel Ethiopia 
Hope TV German
Hope Channel Iceland
Hope Channel India 
Hope Channel Israel
Hope Channel Sweden
Hope Channel UK
Hope Channel Zambia
Hope Channel Sri Lanka
Hope Channel Armenia
Hope Channel Tonga
Hope Channel Solomon Islands
Hope Channel Cook Islands
Hope Channel French

Internet channels

Hope Channel Czech 
Hope Channel Finland
Hope Channel Norge 
Hope Channel Ukraine

OnDemand channels
Hope Channel South Pacific

See also 

 Media ministries of the Seventh-day Adventist Church
 Glorystar

External links

Christian mass media companies
Christian television networks
Seventh-day Adventist media
International broadcasters
Television networks in the United States
Religious television stations in the United States
Television channels and stations established in 2003
2003 establishments in the United States
Seventh-day Adventist organizations